La Jolla is a hilly, seaside area within San Diego, occupying  of curving coastline along the Pacific Ocean. The population reported in the 2010 census was 46,781.

There are some 16 neighborhoods in La Jolla.

La Jolla is home to many educational institutions and a variety of businesses in the areas of lodging, dining, shopping, software, finance, real estate, bioengineering, medical practice and scientific research. The University of California, San Diego (UCSD), is located in La Jolla, as are the Salk Institute, Scripps Institution of Oceanography (part of UCSD), Scripps Research Institute, and the headquarters of National University (though its academic campuses are elsewhere).

History

Origin of the name

Local Native Americans, the Kumeyaay, called this location ,  ( = ). The topographic feature that gave rise to the name "holes" is uncertain; it probably refers to sea-level caves located on the north-facing bluffs, which are visible from La Jolla Shores. Another suggestion for the origin of the name is that it is an alternative spelling of the Spanish phrase , which means . Despite being disputed by scholars, this derivation of the name has been widely cited in popular culture. This supposed origin gave rise to the nickname "The Jewel". The name may also come from the Spanish , meaning a geographic hollow. Different spelling conventions over the years would permit this to be written as La Jolla.

Early history

During the Mexican period of San Diego's history, La Jolla was mapped as pueblo land and contained about 60 lots. When California became a state in 1850, the La Jolla area was incorporated as part of the chartered City of San Diego. In 1870, Charles Dean acquired several of the pueblo lots and subdivided them into an area that became known as La Jolla Park. Dean was unable to develop the land and left San Diego in 1881. A real estate boom in the 1880s led speculators Frank T. Botsford and George W. Heald to further develop the sparsely settled area.

In the 1890s, the San Diego, Pacific Beach, and La Jolla Railway was built, connecting La Jolla to the rest of San Diego. La Jolla became known as a resort area. To attract visitors to the beach, the railway built facilities such as a bath house and a dance pavilion. Visitors were housed in small cottages and bungalows above La Jolla Cove, as well as a temporary tent city erected every summer. Two of the cottages that were built in 1894, the "Red Roost" and the "Red Rest", also known as the "Neptune and Cove Tea Room", still exist and are the oldest buildings in La Jolla that are still on their original site. The two cottages have been vacant since the 1980s, boarded up and covered in tarpaulins while their fate was debated. In November 2020 the Red Rest was largely destroyed by fire. 

The La Jolla Park Hotel opened in 1893. The Hotel Cabrillo was built in 1908 by "Squire" James A. Wilson and was later incorporated into the La Valencia Hotel.

By 1900, La Jolla comprised 100 buildings and 350 residents. The first reading room (library) was built in 1898. A volunteer fire brigade was organized in 1907; the city of San Diego established a regular fire house in 1914. Livery stable owner Nathan Rannells served successively as La Jolla's volunteer fire captain, first police officer (the only San Diego police officer north of Mission Valley), and first postmaster.

La Jolla Elementary School began educating local children in 1896. The Bishop's School opened in 1909. La Jolla High School was established in 1922. Between 1951 and 1963, other elementary schools (Bird Rock, Decatur, Scripps, and Torrey Pines) were established in the area to ease overcrowding. The La Jolla Beach and Yacht Club (later the La Jolla Beach and Tennis Club) was built in 1927.

Ellen Browning Scripps

In 1896 journalist and publisher Ellen Browning Scripps settled in La Jolla, where she lived for the last 35 years of her life. She was wealthy in her own right from her investments and writing, and she inherited a large sum from her brother George H. Scripps in 1900. She devoted herself to philanthropic endeavors, particularly those benefiting her adopted home of La Jolla. She commissioned many of La Jolla's most notable buildings, usually designed by Irving Gill or his nephew and partner Louis John Gill. Many of these buildings are now on the National Register of Historic Places or are listed as historic by the city of San Diego; these include the La Jolla Woman's Club (1914), the La Jolla Recreational Center (1915), the earliest buildings of The Bishop's School, and the Old Scripps Building at the Scripps Institution of Oceanography, as well as her own residence, built in 1915 and now housing the Museum of Contemporary Art San Diego. Her donations also launched the Scripps Memorial Hospital in 1924 (originally located on Prospect Street in La Jolla until it moved to its present site in 1964), the Scripps Metabolic Clinic (now the Scripps Research Institute), and the Children's Pool. Ellen Browning Scripps also founded Scripps College, a women's college,  in 1926. Scripps College is located in Claremont in Los Angeles County (not to be confused with Clairemont, a community of San Diego).

Scripps Institution of Oceanography

The Scripps Institution of Oceanography, one of the nation's oldest oceanographic institutes, was founded in 1903 by William Emerson Ritter, chair of the zoology department at the University of California, Berkeley, with financial support from Scripps and her brother E. W. Scripps. At first the institution operated out of a boathouse in Coronado. In 1905, they purchased a  site in La Jolla, where the Institution still stands today. The first laboratory buildings there opened in 1907. The institution became part of the University of California in 1912. Ultimately, it became the nucleus for the establishment of the University of California San Diego.

Camp Matthews
From 1917 through 1964, the United States Marine Corps maintained a military base in La Jolla. The base was used for marksmanship training and was known as Camp Calvin B. Matthews. During and after World War II, the population of La Jolla grew, causing residential development to draw close to the base, so that it became less and less suitable as a firing range because of risk to the adjacent civilian population. Meanwhile, the site was being eyed as a location for a proposed new campus of the University of California. In 1962, Camp Matthews was declared surplus by the Marine Corps. The base formally closed in 1964, and that same year, the first class of undergraduates enrolled in the University of California San Diego.

University of California, San Diego
Local civic leaders had long toyed with the idea of a San Diego campus of the University of California, and the quest became more definite following World War II. The Scripps Institution of Oceanography, under its director Roger Revelle, had become an important defense contractor, and local aerospace companies like Convair were pressing for local training for their scientists and engineers. The state legislature proposed the idea in 1955, and the Regents of the University formally approved it in 1960. During the planning stage of the university's establishment, it was briefly known as the "University of California, La Jolla", but the name was changed to "University of California, San Diego" before its founding in 1960. The founding chancellor was Herbert York, named in 1961, and the second chancellor was John Semple Galbraith, named in 1964. The university was designed to have a "college" system; there are now seven colleges. The first college was established in 1965 and was named Revelle College after Roger Revelle, who is regarded as the "father" of the university. A medical school was established in 1968. The landmark Geisel Library with its Brutalist architecture opened in 1970. The university is the second largest employer in the city and has the 7th largest research expenditure in the country.

Antisemitism
The Camp Matthews site for the University was selected with some hesitation; one of the concerns was "whether La Jollans in particular would lay aside old prejudices in order to welcome a culturally, ethnically, and religiously diverse professoriate into their midst". La Jolla had a history of restrictive housing policies, often specified in deeds and ownership documents. In La Jolla Shores and La Jolla Hermosa, only people with pure European ancestry could own property; this excluded Jews, who were not considered white. Such "restrictive covenants" were once fairly common throughout the United States; the 1948 Supreme Court case Shelley v. Kraemer ruled them to be unenforceable, and Congress outlawed them twenty years later via the Fair Housing Act (Title VII of the Civil Rights Act of 1968). However, realtors and property owners in La Jolla continued to use more subtle ways of preventing or discouraging Jews from owning property there. Revelle stated the issue bluntly: "You can't have a university without having Jewish professors. The Real Estate Broker's Association and their supporters in La Jolla had to make up their minds whether they wanted a university or an anti-Semitic covenant. You couldn't have both." The issue was overcome; La Jolla now boasts a thriving Jewish population, and there are four synagogues in La Jolla.

Mount Soledad cross

Mount Soledad is an  hill on the eastern edge of La Jolla and one of the highest points in San Diego. A large Christian cross was placed at the top in 1913 as a prominent landmark. It has been replaced twice, most recently in 1954 with a  cross ( tall including the base). Originally known as the "Mount Soledad Easter Cross", its presence on publicly owned land was challenged in the 1980s as a violation of the separation of church and state. Since then the cross has had a war memorial built around it and was renamed "Mount Soledad Veterans War Memorial".

The issue has been in almost continual litigation ever since, with the city attempting to sell or give away the land under the cross. By an act of Congress, the federal government took possession of it under eminent domain in 2006. The United States Court of Appeals for the Ninth Circuit declared the cross unconstitutional in 2011, and the Supreme Court of the United States declined to hear an appeal. In December 2013, U.S. District Judge Larry Burns ordered that the cross be removed within 90 days, but stayed the order pending a forthcoming appeal by the government.

On July 20, 2015, a group called the Mt. Soledad Memorial Association reported that it had bought the land under the cross from the Department of Defense for $1.4 million. On September 7, 2016, the 9th U.S. Circuit Court of Appeals issued a one-page ruling, ordering dismissal of the case and an end to all current appeals, stating that the case was now moot because the cross was no longer on government land. Both sides agreed that this decision puts a final end to the case.

Arts
La Jolla became an art colony in 1894 when Anna Held (also known as Anna Held Heinrich) established the Green Dragon Colony. This was a cluster of twelve cottages designed by Irving Gill, who had moved to San Diego only a year earlier and later became San Diego's best-known architect.

The La Jolla Playhouse was founded in 1947 by Gregory Peck, Dorothy McGuire, and Mel Ferrer. It became inactive in 1959, but was revived in 1983 on the University of California campus under the leadership of Des McAnuff. It now incorporates three theaters: the Mandell Weiss Theatre (1983), the Mandell Weiss Forum (1991) and the Potiker Theater (2005).

The Museum of Contemporary Art San Diego was founded in 1941 in La Jolla, in the former home of Ellen Browning Scripps (designed by Irving J. Gill). The museum has undergone several renovations and expansions, and is working on plans to triple its size.

The La Jolla Music Society was founded in 1941 as the Musical Arts Society of La Jolla by Nikolai Sokoloff, former conductor of the Cleveland Orchestra. It presented the premieres of commissioned works in the auditorium of La Jolla High School before presenting their concerts in the Sherwood Auditorium of the Museum of Contemporary Art San Diego. Since April 2019, the Conrad Prebys Performing Arts Center is the permanent home of La Jolla Music Society and hosts world-class performances presented by LJMS as well as other San Diego arts presenters.  Additionally, The Conrad will see a wide range of conferences, corporate meetings, and private events.

As a regional shopping district
In the mid-20th century, Downtown La Jolla was a major regional retail district with branches of major department stores Walker Scott and upscale specialty department stores Saks Fifth Avenue and I. Magnin, all on Girard Avenue within walking distance of each other. Boutique shopping continues there, but heavyweight retail presence, since the closing of the last downtown La Jolla department store, Saks Fifth Avenue, in 2004, has long since moved to Westfield UTC and other adjacent shopping centers.

Geography

Demarcation
The community's border starts at Pacific Beach to the south and extends along the Pacific Ocean shoreline north to include Torrey Pines State Natural Reserve ending at Del Mar, California. La Jolla encompasses the neighborhoods of Bird Rock, Windansea Beach, the commercial center known as the Village of La Jolla, Muirlands, La Jolla Shores, La Jolla Farms, Torrey Pines, and Mount Soledad to name a few.

The City of San Diego defines the community's eastern boundary as Gilman Drive and the Interstate 5 freeway and the northern boundary as UCSD.

The United States Postal Service defines a somewhat larger area, assigning the community the 92037 ZIP Code, recognizing it as a historically and geographically distinct area. This unique ZIP code allows addresses to read La Jolla, CA, and is the only community within the City of San Diego so recognized. Additionally, it is in the 919xx/920xx sequence used for suburban and rural ZIP Codes in San Diego County, rather than the 921xx sequence used for the remainder of the City of San Diego. These conditions sometimes lead to the erroneous impression that La Jolla is a separate city, rather than a part of San Diego. The 92037 ZIP code extends the northeasterly boundary to Genesee Avenue and the northerly boundary to Del Mar, California. The UCSD campus, also part of La Jolla, has ZIP Codes 92092 and 92093.

Despite the city and postal service definitions, La Jolla does not have universally accepted boundaries. In the 1980s, the trustees of Scripps Hospital voted to move the campus from downtown La Jolla to University City, east of Interstate 5 and not within the traditional boundaries of La Jolla. The governing documents of the hospital required it to be located in La Jolla, however. A court ruled that "La Jolla" exists merely as a "state of mind" and thus allowed the relocation of the hospital. Several businesses and housing developments east of Interstate 5 use "La Jolla" in their names despite being geographically located in the University City neighborhood of San Diego, which includes areas east of Interstate 5.

Geology
La Jolla is an area of mixed geology, including sandy beaches and rocky shorelines. The area is occasionally susceptible to flooding and ocean storms, as occurred in January and December 2010.

Mount Soledad is covered with the narrow roads that follow its contours and hundreds of homes overlooking the ocean on its slopes. It is the home of the large concrete Mount Soledad Easter Cross built in 1954, later designated a Korean War Memorial, that became the center of a controversy over the display of religious symbols on government property.

The most compelling geographical highlight of La Jolla is its ocean front, with alternating rugged and sandy coastline that serves as habitat for many wild seal congregations. Popular beaches and coastal access points, listed from north to south, include:
Torrey Pines State Natural Reserve
Black's Beach (a de facto nude beach)
Scripps, near Scripps Institution of Oceanography
La Jolla Shores
La Jolla Beach and Tennis Club
La Jolla Cove
Boomers Beach
Shell Beach
Children's Pool Beach
Wipeout Beach
Horseshoes
Marine Street
Windansea Beach
Bird Rock

Climate

Demographics
According to United States Census Bureau figures, the ethnic/racial makeup of La Jolla is 82.5% White, 0.8% Black, 0.2% American Indian, 11.2% Asian, 0.1% Pacific Islander, 2.0% some other race, and 3.1% two or more races.  Latinos, who may be of any race, form 7.2% of La Jolla's population. There is also a sizeable Persian population in La Jolla.

La Jolla had the highest home prices in the nation in 2008 and 2009, according to a survey by Coldwell Banker. The survey compares the cost of a standardized four-bedroom home in communities across the country. The average price for such a home in La Jolla was reported as US$1.842 million in 2008 and US$2.125 million in 2009.

Neighborhoods
 La Jolla Farms — This northern La Jolla neighborhood is just west of UCSD. It includes the Torrey Pines Gliderport, the Salk Institute, and a group of expensive homes on the cliffs above Black's Beach (one of which is the Audrey Geisel University House).
 La Jolla Shores — The residential area and the Scripps Institution of Oceanography campus along La Jolla Shores Beach and east up the hillside.  Also includes a small business district of shops and restaurants along Avenida de la Playa.
 La Jolla Heights — The homes on the hills overlooking La Jolla Shores. No businesses.
 Hidden Valley — Lower portion of Mount Soledad on the northern slopes. No businesses.
 Country Club — Lower Mt. Soledad on the northwest side, including the La Jolla Country Club golf course.
 Village — Also called Village of La Jolla (not to be confused with La Jolla Village) the "downtown" business district area, including most of La Jolla's shops and restaurants, and the immediately surrounding higher density and single family residential areas.
 Beach-Barber Tract — The coastal section from Windansea Beach to the Village. A few shops and restaurants along La Jolla Boulevard.
 Lower Hermosa — Coastal strip south of Beach-Barber Tract. No businesses.
 Bird Rock — Southern coastal La Jolla, and the very lowest slopes of Mt. Soledad in the area. Notable for shops and restaurants along La Jolla Boulevard, five traffic roundabouts on La Jolla Boulevard, coastal bluffs, and surfing areas just two blocks off the main drag.
 Muirlands — Relatively large area on western middle slope of Mt. Soledad. No businesses.
 La Jolla Mesa  — A strip on the lower southern side of Mt. Soledad, bordering Pacific Beach. No businesses.
 La Jolla Alta — A master-planned development east of La Jolla Mesa. No businesses.
 Soledad South —  Southeastern slopes of Mt. Soledad, all the way up to the top, east of La Jolla Alta.
 Muirlands West — The small neighborhood between Muirlands to the south, and Country Club to the north. No businesses.
 Upper Hermosa —  Southwestern La Jolla, north of Bird Rock and east of La Jolla Blvd.
 La Jolla Village — Not to be confused with the Village (of La Jolla). In northeast La Jolla, east of La Jolla Heights, west of I-5 and south of UCSD. The neighborhood's namesake is the La Jolla Village Square shopping and residential mall, which includes two movie theaters.

Community groups

The La Jolla Community Planning Association advises the city council, Planning Commission, City Planning Department as well as other governmental agency as appropriate in the initial preparation, adoption of, implementation of, or amendment to the General or Community Plan as it pertains to the La Jolla area as well as review specific development proposals. The nonprofit La Jolla Town Council represents the interests of La Jolla businesses and residents that belong to the Council. The Bird Rock Community Council serves the Bird Rock neighborhood, while the La Jolla Shores Association serves the La Jolla Shores neighborhood. La Jolla Village Merchants Association, Inc. is a non-profit organization formed in February 2011 to manage the La Jolla Village Business Improvement District for the City of San Diego.

Community organizations include Independent La Jolla, a membership-based citizens group seeking to secede from the city of San Diego. Service clubs in La Jolla include Kiwanis, Rotary, La Jolla Woman's Club and the Social Service League of La Jolla, to name a few.

Attractions and activities

La Jolla is the location of Torrey Pines Golf Course, the site each January or February of a PGA Tour event formerly known as the Buick Invitational and since 2010, called the Farmers Insurance Open. Torrey Pines also hosted the 2008 U.S. Open, and will host the 2021 U.S. Open. Nearby are the de facto nude beach, Black's Beach, and the Torrey Pines Gliderport.

Downtown La Jolla is noted for jewelry stores, boutiques, upmarket restaurants and hotels. Prospect Street and Girard Avenue are also shopping and dining districts. The Museum of Contemporary Art, founded in 1941, is located just above the waterfront in what was originally the 1915 residence of philanthropist Ellen Browning Scripps. The museum has a permanent collection with more than 3,500 post-1950 American and European works, including paintings, works on paper, sculptures, photographic art, design objects and video works. The museum was renamed Museum of Contemporary Art San Diego in 1990 to recognize its regional significance.

Beaches and ocean access include Windansea Beach, La Jolla Shores, La Jolla Cove and Children's Pool Beach. For many years, La Jolla has been the host of a rough water swim at La Jolla Cove.

In 2011, the La Jolla Community Foundation commissioned various artists to contribute to the scenery of the town, through various murals. Some of the artists that are featured in the series are John Baldessari, Julian Opie, and Kim MacConnel. There are 11 murals in the series, all of which will be on display for two years.

The La Jolla Concours d'Elegance auto show is hosted at La Jolla Cove annually.

Education

Higher education
The University of California San Diego is the center of higher education in La Jolla. The campus' name was briefly UC La Jolla during the planning stage of the university's development. UCSD includes the Scripps Institution of Oceanography and the San Diego Supercomputer Center.

National University is also headquartered in La Jolla, with several academic campuses located throughout the county and the state. Among the several research institutes near UCSD and in the nearby Torrey Pines Science Park are Scripps Research Institute, the Sanford Burnham Prebys Medical Discovery Institute (formerly called the La Jolla Cancer Research Foundation), La Jolla Institute for Allergy and Immunology (LJI), and the Salk Institute for Biological Studies.

Other schools
La Jolla is served by the San Diego Unified School District. Public schools include La Jolla High School, La Jolla Elementary,  Muirlands Middle School, Torrey Pines Elementary, and Bird Rock Elementary, as well as Preuss School, a public charter school. The community's prep schools are The Bishop's School, The Children's School, Delphi Academy, Stella Maris Academy, The Gillispie School, and the Evans School. La Jolla Country Day School is located in the nearby community of University City.

Religious institutions

Christian:
 All Hallows Catholic Church
 Assembly of God
 Christian Science Church
 Congregational Church (the first church built; burned down in 1915 and re-built in 1916 at 1216 Cave Street)
 Barabbas Road Church
 First Baptist Church
 La Jolla Christian Fellowship
 La Jolla Lutheran Church
 La Jolla Presbyterian Church
 La Jolla Religious Society of Friends
 La Jolla United Methodist Church
 Mary, Star of the Sea Catholic church
 Prince Chapel by the Sea (African Methodist Episcopal Church)
 St. James by-the-Sea Episcopal
 St. John Church of God in Christ
 Torrey Pines Christian Church
 The Church Of Jesus Christ of Latter-day Saints San Diego California Temple
 University Lutheran Church

Jewish:
 Congregation Beth El
 Congregation Adat Yeshurun
 Chabad Jewish Center of La Jolla

Business and media
La Jolla (under the fictionalized name "Esmerelda") is the setting for Raymond Chandler's final
Philip Marlowe novel, Playback, published in 1958. Chandler
lived in La Jolla for the previous decade. La Jolla's Hotel del Charro becomes "Rancho
Descansado" in the novel.  A number of landmarks described can still be found today.

La Jolla was home to the comic book publisher WildStorm Productions, from its founding by Jim Lee in 1993, until its closing in 2012 when DC Comics, which had purchased the publisher as an imprint in 1998, absorbed the company and moved the office to Burbank, California.

La Jolla is the setting for the 2011 season of The Real World: San Diego, the twenty-sixth season of the long-running MTV reality television series.

La Jolla is the base for the Sundt Memorial Foundation, a national organization aimed at discouraging youth from getting involved in drugs.

La Jolla is mentioned in the Beach Boys' 1963 song Surfin' U.S.A. and in The Network's 2003 song Spike.

On June 25, 2020 Wilbur Soot released an album called Your City Gave Me Asthma, which included a song called La Jolla after this place.

The Netflix sitcom Grace and Frankie is set in La Jolla, although exteriors are filmed in other parts of California.

Scenes from the 2018 film The Samuel Project were filmed in La Jolla.

Disney+'s Big Shot takes place in La Jolla.

Notable people

La Jolla has been the home to many notable people, including prominent scientists, business people, artists, writers, surfers and performers.

See also

 List of San Diego Historical Landmarks in La Jolla
 KGTV Tower
 Birch Aquarium at Scripps
 La Jolla Historical Society

Notes

References

Further reading

External links

 La Jolla Town Council
 Local history timeline

 
Neighborhoods in San Diego
Populated coastal places in California
Seaside resorts in California
Economy of San Diego
Spa towns in California
Tourist attractions in San Diego